"Jeanie with the Light Brown Hair" is a parlor song by Stephen Foster (1826–1864). It was published by Firth, Pond & Co. of New York in 1854. Foster wrote the song with his estranged wife Jane McDowell in mind. The lyrics allude to a permanent separation.

"Jeanie" was a notorious beneficiary of the ASCAP boycott of 1941, a dispute caused by ASCAP increasing its licensing fees. During this period, radio broadcasters played only public-domain music or songs licensed by ASCAP rival BMI. According to a 1941 article in Time magazine, "So often had BMI's Jeannie [sic] With the Light Brown Hair been played that she was widely reported to have turned grey."

Lyrics

Other versions
Bing Crosby recorded the song on March 22, 1940, for Decca Records with John Scott Trotter and His Orchestra.

Violinist Jascha Heifetz transcribed the song for the violin and it became a signature piece for him for years. The transcription has been performed by many subsequent violinists.

In popular culture

The opening line was notably used as the basis for the title of the 1960s TV series I Dream of Jeannie.

Actress Rhonda Fleming as Madeline Danzeeger while playing a piano croons the opening verse in the 1950 Western film The Eagle and the Hawk.

In the 1956 Bugs Bunny short Broom-Stick Bunny, a play on the title is used in the closing lines: "Hello, air-raid headquarters? Well, you're not gonna believe this, but I just saw a genie with light brown hair chasing a flying sorceress." In the 1957 short Ali Baba Bunny, Bugs disguises himself as a genie and says "Me genie, the light brown hare." Bugs would also, in other shorts, sing a variation: "I dream of Jeanie, she's a light brown hare" or otherwise make a reference to the song through wordplay.

Episode 12 of the first season of The Phil Silvers Show, title "The Singing Contest" involves his platoon very badly singing the same song throughout the show but a private (Bob Dixon as Pvt. Claude Brubaker) in the platoon who has an excellent singing voice saves their chances to win and they all end up in Florida for the Army finals.

In an episode of the 2001 miniseries Band of Brothers, "Bastogne", a few lines of the song's first stanza are sung loudly a cappella by soldiers Joseph Liebgott, James Alley, and an unnamed soldier as they occupy a foxhole shortly before being shelled by Nazi artillery.

In the 1968 John Cassavetes film Faces, an important scene occurs which revolves around the singing of this song.

The full title is used as the nickname for character Jeanie in Studio 60 on the Sunset Strip, most notably several times in the 2006 episode "The Cold Open".

A 1966 cartoon from The Pink Panther Show is entitled Genie with the Light Pink Fur; it is about a magic lamp that turns the Pink Panther into a genie.

In the 1940 film Beyond Tomorrow the character Jimmy Houston (Richard Carlson) sings the entire song during a Christmas dinner with a band accompaniment.

The opening line of the song is heard on a parlor piano in the 1998 television movie, The Love Letter.

A variation of the title is used for Ellen Conford's "Genie with the Light Blue Hair".

The song is included on the 1998 Prima Voce album Songs and Ballads by Richard Crooks.

The song figures prominently in an episode of the Old Time Radio show Quiet, Please titled "And Jeannie Dreams of Me" which  aired October 17, 1948. The episode uses the song throughout and its title is a reversal of the song title which acts as a foreshadowing to the theme of the episode.

An episode of The Chipmunks features the song, as Dave Seville sings it for his girlfriend named, of course, Jeannie...and then the Chipmunks sing a very silly and rude parody of the song, "Jeannie with the Green-Purple Hair", which offends Jeannie and annoys Dave, who retaliates by forcing the Chipmunks to sing the proper song over and over again until they have the lyrics memorized by heart.

References

1854 songs
American songs
Parlor songs
Songs written by Stephen Foster